This is list of countries by their inequality adjusted income, as defined and measured by the United Nations Development Programme. The income index is one component of the Human Development Index, but is also used separately. The adjustment of income for inequality based on the Gini coefficient was first proposed by Amartya Sen in 1976. The adjustment was first applied by the UN on income data in 1993, before later being expanded to the general HDI. All data are from 2013.

References

See also 

 List of countries by share of income of the richest one percent

Global inequality
Income distribution
Inequality
Income